Garlamadugu is a village in Pedavegi mandal, located in West Godavari district of Andhra Pradesh, India.

References 

Villages in West Godavari district